The term cardial may refer to:
 cardial or cardiac, pertaining to the heart (Ancient Greek καρδιά, kardiá, "heart")
 Cardial Ware, a Neolithic decorative style